Titos Koutentakis (born 22 August 2003) is a Greek professional footballer who plays as a midfielder for Super League 2 club Makedonikos, on loan from PAOK B.

References

2003 births
Living people
Greek footballers
Super League Greece 2 players
PAOK FC B players
Association football midfielders
Footballers from Heraklion